Marcello Tonelli (born 25 April 1975) is an Italian corporate and social strategist, best known for his work as an author in the field of sustainable development. As a veteran athlete, he set three world records in lifesaving and has been an accomplished international masters swimmer.

Biography
Tonelli was born in Biella, but left Italy at a young age on an athletic scholarship to pursue a professional career in the US and then Australia, where he eventually acquired dual citizenship. He now resides in Spain.

Education and career
Tonelli received a B.A from the University of Pacific, an M.I.S. from James Cook University, and in 2009 a PhD from the Queensland University of Technology in strategic management, comparing the effectiveness of different processes for collective problem-solving. In 2010 he started working at the Australian Centre for Entrepreneurship Research (ACE) under the leadership of professor Per Davidsson and got involved in the international-collaborative GEM project, which ignited his interest in how entrepreneurial opportunities are sought and perceived in contexts of poverty (bottom of the pyramid). 

He worked as a strategic advisor since the late 1990s, beginning to gradually move away from the conventional business sector only in 2011. At that time he started favouring the design and testing of entrepreneurial approaches that could help alleviating poverty and guarantee the effectiveness of microcredit schemes overtime. Over the following decade his concern with sustainable development continued to intensify, eventually bridging all its three facets – economic, social, and environmental – and setting out a new methodology for enhanced sustainability management that integrated the circular economy theoretical framework with more traditional strategic management tools.

Throughout his career, Tonelli published a number of practice-oriented articles and books.
Amongst his writings is Entrepreneurship at the Bottom of the Pyramid, which won the 2017 Nautilus Award and the Hollywood Book Festival in 2018. The book discusses a variety of problematic settings in the Fourth World – with a strong emphasis on locations visited by the author during a two-year period of ethnographic studies – explaining how proper training in entrepreneurship and innovation can empower individuals and therefore contribute to community advancement. In 2018 he wrote Strategic Management and the Circular Economy, a book that received worldwide recognition and continues to be a leading reference in the circularity debate. The book reveals the interactions that can exist between companies and stakeholders at various levels of society for the attainment of a more sustainable future. In 2020 Tonelli was presented with a silver medal at the Axiom Business Book Awards.

Lifesaving
Tonelli entered the sport of lifesaving at the age of 45, competing in both open and masters categories. In the M45 age group he set three world records, ratified by the International Life Saving Federation, in the 200m obstacle swim and the 100m rescue medley.

Swimming
In the late 1990s Tonelli swam for the Pacific Tigers in the NCAA Division I under U.S. Olympics coach Ray Looze. Years later, in Australia, he was the oldest competitor at the FINA Swimming World Cup in both 2005 and 2007.
A medley specialist, Tonelli held various national records as a masters swimmer in Spain, Italy and Australia. Over the years he has ranked No. 1 in the world in the 100-200-400 meters medley and won multiple medals at World and European masters championships.

See also
Problem solving
Sustainable development
Circular economy
Bottom of the pyramid
Poverty reduction
Microcredit
List of world records in life saving

References

External links
 World Records on ILS web site
 FINA Masters All Time Top 10
 Marcello Tonelli at SwimRankings.net
 Marcello Tonelli at Fina.org
 

1975 births
Living people
Italian emigrants to Australia
Academic staff of Queensland University of Technology
University of the Pacific (United States) alumni
Italian expatriates in the United States
James Cook University alumni
Australian expatriates in Spain
People from Biella
Italian expatriates in Spain
Naturalised citizens of Australia
Australian male swimmers
Italian male swimmers